Gerald M. Penner (born June 20, 1934) was a Canadian ice hockey player with the Trail Smoke Eaters. He won a gold medal at the 1961 World Ice Hockey Championships in Switzerland. He also played with the New Westminster Royals and Seattle Americans.

References

1934 births
Living people
Canadian ice hockey left wingers
Seattle Americans players
Sportspeople from Regina, Saskatchewan
Ice hockey people from Saskatchewan